Mastigomycotina is a former polyphyletic taxonomic grouping, a subdivision, of fungi, similar to Phycomycetes, and that included the zoosporic classes Chytridiomycetes, Hyphochytriomycetes, Plasmodiophoromycetes and Oomycetes.

General features of Mastigomycotina:

 They produce flagellated cells during their lifetime.
 May bear rhizoids.
 Mostly, filamentous and having coenocytic mycelium.
 Show centric nuclear division.
 Perfect state of spores is typically oospores.

See also

 Fungus-like organisms

References

Obsolete fungus taxa